Barbara Mensing (born 23 September 1960 in Herten, North Rhine-Westphalia) is an archer from Germany.

References
 

1960 births
Living people
People from Herten
Sportspeople from Münster (region)
German female archers
Olympic archers of Germany
Archers at the 1996 Summer Olympics
Archers at the 2000 Summer Olympics
Olympic silver medalists for Germany
Olympic bronze medalists for Germany
Olympic medalists in archery
Medalists at the 2000 Summer Olympics
World Archery Championships medalists
Medalists at the 1996 Summer Olympics